Giulio Corsini (28 September 1933 – 31 December 2009) was an Italian professional football player and coach.

Career
Corsini played for 15 seasons (327 games, 3 goals) in the Serie A for Atalanta B.C., A.S. Roma and A.C. Mantova.

After finishing his career as a player, he led Atalanta to the promotion to Serie A in his first season as head coach. After they were relegated, he was fired before he could bring them back. When he took reign of U.C. Sampdoria next, Sampdoria was supposed to play on the second level Serie B. However, due to a scandal and penalties on other teams, Sampdoria kept their Serie A spot. With the roster already assembled for Serie B, Sampdoria had to fight hard to avoid relegation. After the season, he was hired by S.S. Lazio, but was fired after eight games in the next season in which Lazio gained five points and were second from the bottom. Next he was hired by A.C. Cesena, who qualified for the UEFA Cup for the first time in their history. Cesena was knocked out of the cup in the first round and he was fired again. He did not work in the Serie A after that.

Honours
Roma
 Inter-Cities Fairs Cup: 1960–61
 Coppa Italia: 1963–64

References

1933 births
2009 deaths
Italian footballers
Association football defenders
Serie A players
Serie B players
Atalanta B.C. players
A.S. Roma players
Mantova 1911 players
Italian football managers
Serie A managers
Atalanta B.C. managers
U.C. Sampdoria managers
S.S. Lazio managers
A.C. Cesena managers
S.S.C. Bari managers